James Elkins (born 1955) is an American art historian and art critic.  He is E.C. Chadbourne Chair of art history, theory, and criticism at the School of the Art Institute of Chicago. He also coordinates the Stone Summer Theory Institute, a short term school on contemporary art history based at the School of the Art Institute of Chicago.

Education
BA, cum laude, 1977, Cornell University
MFA and MA, 1984, University of Chicago
PhD with honors, 1989, University of Chicago

Publications
Pictures and Tears: A History of People Who Have Cried in Front of Paintings
Chinese Landscape Painting as Western Art History
Pictures of the Body: Pain and Metamorphosis
The Domain of Images
How to Use Your Eyes
What Painting Is
The Poetics of Perspective
The Object Stares Back: On the Nature of Seeing
Why are our Pictures Puzzles?
What Happened to Art Criticism?
Visual Studies: A Skeptical Introduction
Why Art Cannot Be Taught: A Handbook For Art Students
Six Stories From the End of Representation
Stories of Art
On the Strange Place of Religion in Contemporary Art
On Pictures and the Words That Fail Them
Our Beautiful, Dry, and Distant Texts: Art History as Writing
Master Narratives and Their Discontents

References

External links
http://www.jameselkins.com

American art historians
American art critics
School of the Art Institute of Chicago faculty
Art Institute of Chicago
Living people
1955 births